Punisher (1995 series) is a comic book series starring the fictional Marvel Comics vigilante the Punisher.

Publication history
This series followed The Punisher (1985 limited series) and The Punisher (1987 ongoing series), but without "The" in the title. It is the fourth ongoing series to feature the Punisher after the 1987 series, The Punisher War Journal (1988–1995), and The Punisher War Zone (1992–1995). The series was published by the Marvel Comics imprint Marvel Edge and ran for 18 issues from November 1995 to April 1997, all written by John Ostrander.

Prints

Issues

 Condemned
 Family
 Hatchet Job
 Clash
 Firepower
 Hostage to the Devil
 He's Alive!
 Vengeance is Mine!
 Tumbling Down
 Last Shot Fired
 Onslaught Impact 2 - Manhattan Onslaught
 Total X-tinction 01
 Total X-tinction 02
 Total X-tinction 03
 Total X-tinction 04
 Total X-tinction 05
 Dead Man Walking
 Double Cross

Story
The series begins with Frank Castle on death row for the murder of Nick Fury, with the mafia staging Castle's electrocution in order to recruit him into their rankings, which he eventually accepts. During this time he goes by his Italian birth name, Castiglione.

Throughout the series, he is later betrayed by the mob boss, and survived numerous attempts on his life. He is also recruited by S.H.I.E.L.D. to provide protection to a pastor who preaches equality for both humans and mutants alike. The series concludes with Castle, now suffering from amnesia, living in an abandoned Catholic Church. He does remember bits of his violent life, and seems to believe he has a mission.

See also
 1995 in comics

References

External links

Comics by John Ostrander
Defunct American comics
Works about Italian-American organized crime

Comics set in New York City